Sutanphaa also Siva Singha  ( – 14 December 1744) was the 31st king of Assam who reigned from (1714 to 1744 A.D.) He was the eldest son of Rudra Singha. Siva Singha was with his dying father at Guwahati, who then proceeded to the capital Rangpur where he ascended to the throne. He is noted for his elaborate system of espionage. He had numerous temples erected and made large gifts of land to them. With his support Hinduism became the pre-dominant religion of the Ahoms". The king was also a patron of music and literature and music and himself composed Sanskrit songs and learnt songs. During his reign also came the first Europeans to trade with Assam.

Reign
 
As per the death bed injunction of Rudra Singha, he was succeeded by his eldest son Siva Singha (reigned 1714–1744). Siva Singha ascended the throne on the 20th day of Magh, and assumed the Ahom name Sutanphaa and the Hindu name of Siva Singha. He gave up Rudra Singha's plan to organize a confederacy of the rajas of Hindustan and to invade Bengal (Mughal Empire), but obeyed his father's injunction to become a disciple of Krishnaram Bhattacharjya (Nyayavagish), the Shakta priest from nearby Nabadwip in present-day West Bengal. He gave the management of the Kamakhya Temple to Krishnaram, who came to be known as Parbatiya Gosain, as his residence was on top of the Nilachal hill.  Siva Singha accepted him as the royal priest and made a large number of land grants to temples and Brahmin priests. 

Siva Singha is said to have established such an elaborate system of espionage during his reign that he had accurate information of everything that was done or spoken in the kingdom.

Dafla expedition 
There was no war in his reign, except in January 1717 there was an expedition against the Daflas of the northern hills, who had again taken to raiding the plains people. After they had been reduced to submission, an embankment was constructed along the foot of the hills inhabited by them as protection against future raids.

Bar Rajas 

Siba Singha was a staunch Shakta and was greatly influenced by the Brahmin priests and astrologers. In 1722, his spiritual guides and astrologers predicted that his rule would shortly come to end in near future, due to the consequences of chatra-bhanga-yoga. That he not only made many lavish presents to various temples and the Brahmins, in hope of conciliating the gods and averting the calamity but also endeavor to satisfy the alleged decree of fate by a subterfuge that greatly diminished his prestige in the eyes of his people. Therefore at the suggestion of Parvatiya Gosain, consented to endow his chief queen Phuleshwari, a Nat Kalita by caste, with the supreme vest, who assumed the name Pramatheswari and the title of Bar Raja.

Queen Phuleswari minted coins in the joint name of her and her husband where she used Persian legend, the first of its kind in Assam. Phuleswari was more under the influence of the Brahmins, particularly the Parvatiya Gosain than the king. It is believed that this was instigated by Gosain and in her zeal for Sakta Hinduism, she attempted to make Shaktism the State religion. With this objective, she ordered the Vaishnava Gosains to worship the goddess Durga. She then forbade the worship of other deities and personally supervised the act of desecration of the Sonarijan camp. Learning that the Sudra Mahantas were strong monotheists, she held a Durga puja in the capital Rangpur and forced Moamoria and several other Gosains to offer oblations to the goddess and smeared sacrificial blood on their foreheads. The Moamarias never forgave this insult to their spiritual leader and it became one of the prime reasons that they broke out in an open rebellion about half a century later, which came to be known as the Moamoria rebellion.

Phuleshwari in 1731 died while giving birth.

The king then married her sister Draupadi, and made her the Bar Raja, after which she assumed the name of Ambika. Ambika had constructed the famous Sivasagar Siva doul, at her patronage, the famous manuscript on elephantry Hastividyarnava was composed.  She died in 1738. Then Siva Singha then married Endari or Akari-Gabharu, whom he made the Bar Raja, with the name of Sarbeswari. The two successors of Phuleshwari, Ambika and Sarbeswri wielded the same authority and power as her, but were however not as energetic as their predecessor in patronizing Saktism.

Religious proclivities

It was during his reign that Hinduism became the predominant religion among Ahoms, and those who persisted in holding old tribal beliefs and customs came to be regarded as a separate degraded class.

He made numerous temples and made large-number of land grants to Brahmanas, so that out of 48 copper plates recording land grants by all Ahom kings 19 of them belonged to him. He made an attempt to use Saktism as an counterforce against the growing power of Vaisnava Satras. Alongside he made support, provisions of Paiks, and land grants to the Brahman Satras as well.

Administrative and public works 

During Siba Singha's reign, the chief public works were the construction of Dhai Ali and the tanks and temples at Gaurisagar, Sibsagar and Kalugaon. This big tank was dedicated in the name of 'Gauri' or 'Durga', thus it is known as Gaurisagar tank and the entire place is now known as Gaurisagar. She also had dug the Borpatra tank at Kalugaon beside the historical Jerenga Pathar in memory of her brother who happened to be a Borpatra Gohain during her regime. On the north-eastern side of that tank, two temples, namely Bishnu Dol and Jagadhatri Dol were constructed on the bank of the tank named as Lakshmisagar Pukhuri. It was during his second wife Bar Raja Ambika's rule the  Sibsagar tank, Bar Pukhuri, situated within the heart of Sivasagar town was dug. On its banks three temples were built in 1734 – the Sivadol , the Vishnu Dol and the Devi Dol. Many temples were also constructed by Swargadeo Siva Singha in Kamrup including
at Aswaklanta, North Guwahati on the bank of the river Brahmaputra in 1720, Siva Singha built two big temples dedicated to Lord Janardana and Lord Vishnu.

Siva Singha had the land surveyed in Kamrup and Bakata. The register, or Pera Kagaz, based on this survey of Kamrup was still used at the time of the British occupation. This contained a list of all occupied lands, except homesteads with their areas, and particularly of all rent free estates.

It was recorded that in 1739, four Europeans, whose names appear to have been Bill, Godwin, Lister, and Mill, visited King Siva Singha at Rangpur. The king met them at the principal gate of the city where, it is said, they did him homage by falling prostrate at his feet.

Art and literature

Siva Singha was a great patron of literature and music. His reign is considered the golden era of Assamese manuscripts, many notable manuscripts were written one of which was the Hastividyarnava which received royal patronage. Foreign musicians were invited into his country to instruct his own and the Monarch became the author of a  large collection of pious songs.  Siba Singha erected numerous temples and gave away land for the support of the Brahmins and temples with all generosity. His court poets like Ananta Acharyya composed the Ananda Lahari and Kavichandra, the Kam-Kumar Haran Haran and the Dharma Puran at the instance of the king and his first chief queen Phuleshwari.

Death
Siva Singha died on Friday, the tenth of Aghon, 1666 Saka  (14 December, 1744). On his death bed all his four brothers, son Tipam Raja and the nobles attended him on his deathbed.   He was succeeded Charing Raja, who assumed the name of Pramatta Singha after accending the throne and the Ahom name of Sunenphaa.

Gallery

See also
 Ahom dynasty
 Ahom kingdom
 Phuleshwari
Moamoria rebellion

Notes

References

 
 

 
 

Ahom kingdom
Ahom kings
1744 deaths
Year of birth unknown
Hindu monarchs